Stéphane Galland (born 27 October 1969) is a Belgian jazz drummer and composer.

In 2018, the international jazz project called SHIJIN (with Stéphane Galland, saxophonist Jacques Schwarz-Bart, pianist Malcolm Braff, and bassist Laurent David) released their eponymous record SHIJIN on French independent record label alter-nativ.

References

Belgian jazz drummers
1969 births
Living people
Octurn members
Aka Moon members